Viva may refer to:

Companies and organisations
 Viva (network operator), a Dominican mobile network operator
 Viva Air, a Spanish airline taken over by flag carrier Iberia
 Viva Air Dominicana
 VIVA Bahrain, a telecommunication company
 Viva Entertainment, a Philippine media company
 Viva Films, a Philippine film company
 Viva Media, an interactive entertainment company based in New York City
 Visi Media Asia (branded as VIVA), a subsidiary of Bakrie Group
 Viva Records (Philippines), a Philippine record label
 Viva Records (U.S.), subsidiary of Snuff Garrett Records
 Viva! (organisation), a British animal rights group, which focuses on promoting veganism
 Vision with Values (branded as ViVa), political party in Guatemala
 Victoria-Vanuatu Physician Project (branded as ViVa), a Canadian organization that sends doctors to Vanuatu

Film
 Viva (2007 film), a 2007 film directed by Anna Biller
 Viva (2015 film), a 2015 Irish film directed by Paddy Breathnach
 Viva Las Vegas, a 1964 film starring Elvis Presley

Magazines
 Viva (American magazine), an adult woman's magazine that premiered in 1973
 Viva (Canadian magazine), a magazine focusing on holistic medicine that premiered in 2004
 Viva (Dutch magazine), a Dutch weekly magazine for women that premiered in 2012

Music

Bands
 Viva (band), an Indian pop girl group
 Viva, a 1990s British band, part of the Romo movement

Albums
 Viva (Bananarama album), 2009
 Viva (La Düsseldorf album) or the title song, 1978
 Viva! (Roxy Music album), 1976
 Viva (Xmal Deutschland album), 1987
 Viva!, by Jimsaku, 1992

Songs
 "Viva!", a song by Bond

Radio
 Viva (Sirius XM), a channel on the Sirius XM Radio network
 Viva 963, a former UK radio channel

Television

Channels and networks
 Viva (Brazilian TV channel), a Globosat TV channel
 Oprah Winfrey Network (Canadian TV channel), formerly known as Viva
 Television channels and programming block operated by Viva Communications in the Philippines
 Pinoy Box Office, a film channel launched in 1996, formerly known as Viva Cinema until 2003
 Viva TV (Philippine TV channel), a general entertainment television channel launched in 2009, formerly known as Viva Cinema until 2012
 VIVA (German TV channel)
 Viva Cinema, former name of Viva TV, a Philippine channel
 VIVA Media, a German music television network
 Viva (UK and Irish TV channel), a former music and entertainment channel
 VIVA Austria, German music and entertainment channel
 VIVA Germany, music network which was available throughout Europe
 VIVA Poland, a music and entertainment channel

Television shows
 Viva La Bam, an American reality television series that aired on MTV
 Viva Variety, an American sketch comedy series that aired on Comedy Central

Transportation

Automobiles
 Chevrolet Viva, a Russian subcompact sedan
 Perodua Viva, a Malaysian supermini hatchback
 Vauxhall Viva, a British compact car
 Daewoo Lacetti, a Korean compact car, sold in Australia and New Zealand as the Holden Viva
 Opel Karl, a German supermini hatchback, sold in the United Kingdom and Ireland as the Vauxhall Viva

Transit systems
 Viva Rapid Transit, a bus transit system in Ontario, Canada

Other
 IBM ViVA, Virtual Vector Architecture by IBM
 Viva! (organisation), a British animal rights group
 Viva (actress) (born 1938), American actress, writer and Andy Warhol model
 Viva Backus, a Peruvian brand of soft drink
 Viva, Iran, a village in Mazandaran Province
 Viva Kerala, a professional football club based in Kerala, India
 Viva Palestina, a British-based registered charity to the Gaza Strip
 Viva Piñata, a computer game for the Xbox 360 games console
 Viva (interjection), an expression meaning "long live"
 Viva World Cup, an international football tournament organized by the NFB
 Viva, short form of viva voce, another name for an oral exam
 Viva, a diminutive of the Russian first names:
 male first name Aviv 
 female first name Aviva
 VIVA, a brand name of heavy-duty paper towels owned by Kimberly-Clark
 Viva, a brand of BSH Hausgeräte
 ViVa, a 1931 collection by e. e. cummings

See also
 Viva voce (disambiguation)